Simrishamn (old ) is a locality and the seat of Simrishamn Municipality, Skåne County, Sweden with 6,527 inhabitants in 2010. Despite its small population, Simrishamn is, for historical reasons, usually still referred to as a city.

Simrishamn is a picturesque coastal town, built around the main street (Storgatan), that passes the market square, itself being the centre of the town. The climate of Simrishamn is mild, because it is warmed by the Gulf Stream and the Baltic Sea, and the hardiness zone of Simrishamn is 8a, comparable to Paris, France.

History

Simrishamn is first mentioned (as Symbrishafn) in 1161 and as a town in 1361. Simris has been interpreted as "at the mouth of the slow-flowing (river)" and hamn as "port or harbour", meaning present-day Tommarpsån. It has been speculated that the name should have something to do with the Cimbri, a Germanic tribe, as the name also has been "Cimbrishavn". In 1658, when Scania under the Treaty of Roskilde was permanently transferred from Denmark to Sweden, the town had a population of about 200 people. The growth was relatively small until about 1810 when it reached 700 inhabitants, growing to 1365 in 1850 and 1966 in 1890. The local government reform of 1971 made Simrishamn the seat of Simrishamn Municipality with about 20,000 inhabitants.

Climate
The nearest station to Simrishamn is in Skillinge  further down the coastline, also on the open sea. Skillinge has a maritime climate with a moderated coastline and a slightly warmer interior during summers. Österlen has a drier climate than elsewhere in Southern Sweden, although it has no active weather station measuring sunshine. Even so, the cool temperatures of the Baltic Sea keeps the immediate coastline on average a couple of degrees cooler during July days than in places further north in the country. This is due to the dominance of water in the surroundings, whereas the Mälar valley around Stockholm is surrounded by more land.

Especially during summer, seasonal lag is strong on the local coastline. This means that August averages the warmest summer nights and that September is a lot warmer than May as the sea water gradually warms. During winter, this maritime proximity of Österlen reverses the climate patterns and leads to average highs above  on the coastline and frosts usually being weak even while frequent. Records for Skillinge began in 1995 and as such do not contain likely historical extremes. Simrishamn had an active weather station from 1951 that closed in 1996.

Gallery

See also
Simris Runestones

References

External links 

Simrishamn - Official site
Österlen - Official site
Österlen & Ystad - Official site

Populated places in Skåne County
Populated places in Simrishamn Municipality
Municipal seats of Skåne County
Swedish municipal seats
Coastal cities and towns in Sweden
Port cities and towns of the Baltic Sea
14th-century establishments in Skåne County